Wiegele is a surname, a variant of Wiegel. Notable people with the surname include:

Franz Wiegele (born 1965), Austrian ski jumper
Martin Wiegele (born 1978), Austrian golfer

See also
 Hans Wiegel (born 1941), Dutch politician

References

German-language surnames